Sultan Ahmed was the 4th chief of the Bangladesh Navy, addressed as the Chief of Naval Staff (CNS). He was a gunnery officer aboard a missile frigate in the Pakistan Navy and qualified to be a logistics officer on a submarine. Between 1963 and 1968 he was a submarine warfare officer. At the time of the 1971 War, he was studying in the United States Army Intelligence Center for a joint NATO counter-intelligence training program  He was made the Deputy Director General of newly created DGFI under Lieutenant General Ziaur Rahman's supervision. He was a Deputy Martial Law Administrator during the regime of President Hussain Muhammad Ershad and the Minister for Communication and Shipping. He was the chief of Bangladesh navy from 6 August 1984 to 14 August 1990. He was also elected as a Member of Parliament from Rajshahi.

References

|-

Bangladeshi Navy admirals
Chiefs of Naval Staff (Bangladesh)
Pakistan Navy officers
1938 births
2012 deaths
Road Transport and Bridges ministers of Bangladesh